Pascal Loretan (born 20 January 1989 in Leukerbad) is a Swiss sport shooter. He competed at the 2012 Summer Olympics in the Men's 10 metre air rifle and 50 m prone events.  He finished 37th in the 10 metre and 31st in the 50 m prone.

References 

Swiss male sport shooters
Living people
Olympic shooters of Switzerland
Shooters at the 2012 Summer Olympics
1989 births
European Games competitors for Switzerland
Shooters at the 2015 European Games
People from Leukerbad
Sportspeople from Valais
21st-century Swiss people